Michiko Kakutani (born January 9, 1955) is an American writer and retired literary critic, best known for reviewing books for The New York Times from 1983 to 2017. In that role, she won the Pulitzer Prize for Criticism in 1998.

Early life and family
Kakutani, a Japanese American, was born on January 9, 1955, in New Haven, Connecticut. She is the only child of Yale mathematician Shizuo Kakutani and his wife Keiko ("Kay") Uchida.  Her father was born in Japan, her mother was a second-generation Japanese-American who was raised in Berkeley, California. Kakutani's aunt, Yoshiko Uchida, was an author of children's books. Kakutani received her bachelor's degree in English literature from Yale University in 1976, where she studied under author and Yale writing professor John Hersey, among others.

Career
Kakutani initially worked as a reporter for The Washington Post, and then from 1977 to 1979 for Time magazine, where Hersey had worked. In 1979, she joined The New York Times as a reporter.

Literary critic
Kakutani was a literary critic for The New York Times from 1983 until her retirement in 2017. She gained particular notoriety for her sometimes-biting reviews of books from famous authors, with Slate remarking that "her name became a verb, and publishers have referred to her negative reviews as 'getting Kakutani'ed'". 

Many authors who received such reviews gave harsh public responses: in 2006, Kakutani called Jonathan Franzen's The Discomfort Zone "an odious self-portrait of the artist as a young jackass." Franzen subsequently called Kakutani "the stupidest person in New York City". In 2012, Kakutani wrote a negative review of Nassim Nicholas Taleb's Antifragile. In 2018, Taleb stated in his book Skin in the Game that "someone has to have read the book to notice that a reviewer is full of baloney, so in the absence of skin in the game, reviewers such as Michiko Kakutani" can "go on forever without anyone knowing" that they are fabricating and drunk. According to Kira Cochrane in The Guardian, such counterattacks may have bolstered Kakutani's reputation as commendably "fearless."

She has been known to write reviews in the voice of movie or book characters, including Brian Griffin, Austin Powers, Holden Caulfield, Elle Woods of Legally Blonde, and Truman Capote's character Holly Golightly in Breakfast at Tiffany's.

On July 19, 2007, The New York Times published a pre-release story written by Kakutani about Harry Potter and the Deathly Hallows. An account of the ensuing controversy, including the critical comments of some Harry Potter fans, can be found on the newspaper's Public Editor's blog.

Kakutani was parodied in the essay "I Am Michiko Kakutani" by one of her former Yale classmates, Colin McEnroe.

Kakutani announced that she was stepping down as chief book critic of the Times on July 27, 2017. In an article summarizing her book reviewing career, a writer in Vanity Fair called her "the most powerful book critic in the English-speaking world" and credited her with boosting the careers of George Saunders, Mary Karr, David Foster Wallace, Jonathan Franzen, Ian McEwan, Martin Amis, and Zadie Smith.

Later work
In 2018, Kakutani published a book criticizing the Trump administration titled The Death of Truth: Notes on Falsehood in the Age of Trump. In it, Kakutani draws parallels between postmodern philosophy and the number of false statements made by Trump. In an interview for the book, she argued: 

Kakutani's second book, Ex-Libris: 100+ Books to Read and Re-Read, an essay collection about books that she considers personally and culturally influential, was published in 2020.

Personal life
Kakutani is a fan of the New York Yankees. , she lives on the Upper West Side of Manhattan.

During her career at The New York Times, Kakutani developed a reputation as an extremely private person who was seldom seen in public, with articles describing her as "mysterious" and "reclusive". Shawn McCreesh, writing in New York magazine, said that "you were likelier to have seen a snow leopard in Manhattan than to meet Kakutani in the wild". However, upon the publication of The Death of Truth, Kakutani began giving interviews to print outlets, though she declined to appear on television.

Media references
 A fictionalized account of Kakutani's life entitled "Michiko Kakutani and the Sadness of the World!" was published in the online and print magazine Essays & Fictions.
 She is referenced in an episode of the HBO series Sex and the City. In "Critical Condition" (season 5, episode 6), Carrie Bradshaw releases a book that Kakutani reviews. Various characters deem the critic's name "too hard to pronounce," including Miranda Hobbes, who memorably states, "Just don't say her name again — it'll push me over the edge."
 She was referenced in an episode of Luca Guadagnino's limited HBO series We Are Who We Are. During the episode "Right Here, Right Now V", Fraser looks up Kakutani's review of The Kindly Ones after the book is recommended by his crush Jonathan.
 Comedian and Saturday Night Live cast member Bowen Yang performed an impression of Kakutani during his audition for the show, later joking that she was perfect for an impression since many are unaware of what she looks or sounds like.

Publications

Awards
1998: Pulitzer Prize for Criticism

References

External links

 
 .
 .
 .
 .
 .

1955 births
20th-century American journalists
20th-century American women writers
21st-century American journalists
21st-century American women writers
American literary critics
American women critics
American women journalists of Asian descent
American women non-fiction writers
American writers of Japanese descent
American women writers of Asian descent
Critics employed by The New York Times
Critics of postmodernism
Living people
People from the Upper West Side
Pulitzer Prize for Criticism winners
The New York Times Pulitzer Prize winners
The Washington Post journalists
Time (magazine) people
Women literary critics
Writers from Manhattan
Writers from New Haven, Connecticut
Yale College alumni